Herman Bjørklund (29 April 1883 – 15 March 1960) was a Norwegian tennis player. He competed in two events at the 1912 Summer Olympics.

References

1883 births
1960 deaths
Norwegian male tennis players
Olympic tennis players of Norway
Tennis players at the 1912 Summer Olympics
Sportspeople from Oslo
20th-century Norwegian people